Lyaysan Savitskaya (born December 7, 1972 in Krasnodar, RSFSR, Soviet Union) is an honored Master of Sports coach of Russia in Rhythmic gymnastics.

Coaching career 
Savitskaya has a degree in higher physical education and completed her degree at the Kuban State University of Physical Education, Sport and Tourism. She also works as a gym teacher at Grammar school 4 No 9 in Kazan.

Notable students  
 Lala Kramarenko - 2018 European Junior Ball and Ribbon champion, two-time Russian Junior National all-around champion
 Polina Shmatko - 2016 European Junior Clubs and Ball champion, 2018 European Junior Hoop champion

References

External links
 
 Lyaysan Savitskaya MGFSO
 vfrg Coaches
 Lyaysan Savitskaya vk

1972 births
Living people
Russian gymnastics coaches
Russian rhythmic gymnasts
Sportspeople from Krasnodar
Honoured Coaches of Russia